Peter Dolling (born 20 February 1941) is a former  Australian rules footballer who played with South Melbourne in the Victorian Football League (VFL).

Notes

External links 

Living people
1941 births
Australian rules footballers from Victoria (Australia)
Sydney Swans players
Mansfield Football Club players